Nolan Turner (born November 29, 1997) is an American football safety for the Tampa Bay Buccaneers of the National Football League (NFL). He played college football at Clemson.

Early life and high school
Turner grew up in Birmingham, Alabama and attended Vestavia Hills High School. As a senior, he made 63 tackles with five interceptions. Turner initially intended to play college football as a walk-on at Alabama, his father's alma mater, over offers from UAB and Troy. He later committed to play at Clemson after receiving a late offer from head coach Dabo Swinney, a former college teammate of his father's, after two safeties decommitted from the school.

College career
Turner played college football at Clemson for six seasons and redshirted his true freshman season. As a redshirt senior, he made 66 tackles with six tackles for loss and three interceptions and was named second-team All-Atlantic Coast Conference and a second-team All-American by the American Football Coaches Association (AFCA). Turner decided to utilize the extra year of eligibility granted to college athletes who played in the 2020 season due to the coronavirus pandemic and return to Clemson for a sixth season. He had 69 tackles with two tackles for loss, two sacks, three passes broken up, one interception, and a forced fumble in his final season.

Professional career

Turner signed with the Tampa Bay Buccaneers as an undrafted free agent on May 1, 2022. He was waived on August 30, 2022 and signed to the practice squad the next day. He was promoted to the active roster on October 27. He was waived on December 5, and re-signed to the practice squad. He signed a reserve/future contract on January 17, 2023.

Personal life
Turner's late father, Kevin Turner, played fullback at Alabama and in the NFL for the New England Patriots and the Philadelphia Eagles. Kevin Turner died of amyotrophic lateral sclerosis (ALS), which had been triggered by chronic traumatic encephalopathy (CTE), during Nolan's senior year of high school. His younger brother, Cole Turner, plays wide receiver at Clemson.

References

External links
Clemson Tigers bio
Tampa Bay Buccaneers bio

1997 births
Living people
Players of American football from Birmingham, Alabama
American football safeties
Tampa Bay Buccaneers players
Clemson Tigers football players